DiVolvo S.A. - short for Distribuidora Volvo S.A. - was a car manufacturer and dealer from Arica in Chile.

The enterprise was founded in 1959 by Eduardo Averill. With some support from Volvo it began to build an assembly site in Arica. There might also have been some support by Det Norske Veritas. After completion of the site in 1962 there have been built 2956 Volvo 122 S until 1967. The production was based on CKD kits. All of them were four-door sedans. Common or typical features were a front bench seat and steering column gear lever. Some of these cars were also used by the Chilean Police. Some PV544 and P1800 were also assembled at DiVolvo.

DiVolvo also was a dealer, offered maintenance services and served as training facility for Volvo in Southern America.

References

Defunct motor vehicle manufacturers of Chile
Defunct companies of Chile
Manufacturing companies of Chile
Volvo Cars
Vehicle manufacturing companies established in 1959
Vehicle manufacturing companies disestablished in 1967
Chilean companies established in 1959
1967 disestablishments in Chile
Arica